Hackthorn is a village and civil parish in the West Lindsey district of Lincolnshire, England. It is combined with Cold Hanworth to form the parish council of Hackthorn and Cold Hanworth. The population of the civil parish (including Cold Hanworth) at the 2011 census was 207. According to the 2001 Census it had a population of 180. The village is part of the Owmby Group of parishes.

The village dates back to Roman times.

Situated among the trees of the park overlooking the lake is the parish church, dedicated to St Michael and All Angels. A village church is mentioned in the Domesday Book, although the present church is a Victorian gothic building. It contains carved woodwork in the reredos screen and gallery, and an 1869 Nicholson Organ, fully restored in 2006.

There is also a primary school, post office, shop and village hall.

References

External links

Villages in Lincolnshire
Civil parishes in Lincolnshire
West Lindsey District